I Once Had a Beautiful Homeland is a 1928 German silent film directed by Max Mack and starring Leo Peukert, Grete Reinwald, and Ernst Rückert.

The film's art direction was by August Rinaldi.

Cast

References

Bibliography

External links

1928 films
Films of the Weimar Republic
Films directed by Max Mack
German silent feature films
German black-and-white films